Tricyanaula is a genus of moth in the family Gelechiidae.

Species
The species of this genus are:

Tricyanaula aurantiaca (Walsingham, 1887) (from Sri Lanka)
Tricyanaula metallica (Walsingham, 1891) (from South Africa and the Gambia)

Former species
Tricyanaula amethystias (Meyrick 1906)
Tricyanaula anthistis Meyrick 1929
Tricyanaula augusta (Meyrick 1911)
Tricyanaula cyanozona (Meyrick 1923)
Tricyanaula perelegans Omelko &Omelko, 1993
Tricyanaula hoplocrates Meyrick, 1932

References
Meyrick, 1925. Gen. Insect., 184, 131.

Anacampsini
Moth genera